Sweden was present at the Eurovision Song Contest 1998, held in Birmingham, the United Kingdom.

Before Eurovision

Melodifestivalen 1998 
Melodifestivalen 1998 was the selection for the 38th song to represent Sweden at the Eurovision Song Contest. It was the 37th time that this system of picking a song had been used. 1,141 songs were submitted to SVT for the competition, with ten songs selected to compete. Five of the songs were eliminated and the remaining five were voted on by 11 regional juries. The final was held in the Malmö Musikteater in Malmö on 14 March 1998, presented by Pernilla Månsson and Magnus Karlsson, and was broadcast on SVT2 and Sveriges Radio's P4 network. The show was watched by 2,881,000 people and the winner was "Kärleken är", sung by Jill Johnson and composed by Bobby Ljunggren, Håkan Almqvist and Ingela Forsman.

At Eurovision
Johnson sang in the 19th position on the night of the contest, and at the close of voting she finished 10th out of 25 countries, receiving 53 points. The Swedish televoting awarded its 12 points to Norway.

Voting

References

External links
TV broadcastings at SVT's open archive

1998
Countries in the Eurovision Song Contest 1998
1998
Eurovision
Eurovision